De Beurs may refer to: 
 De Beurs (Harlingen), a former hotel on the Noorderhaven Harlingen 
 De Beurs (1635), an exhibition center in Rotterdam from 1635 to 1736
 De Beurs (1736), an exhibition center in Rotterdam from 1736 to 1940
 Beurs van Berlage, a national monument, located on the Damrak and la Bourse in Amsterdam

See also  
 Wilhelmus Beurs (1656 – 1700), a Dutch Golden Age painter